Cagayan de Oro's at-large congressional district is an obsolete congressional district that encompassed the entire Cagayan de Oro prior to its 2007 reapportionment that took effect in the same year. It existed from 1984 to 2007, when Cagayan de Oro elected a representative city-wide at-large to the Batasang Pambansa and to the restored House of Representatives. Before 1984 when it was granted its own seat in the regular Batasan assembly as a highly-urbanized city, Cagayan de Oro was represented as part of the multi-member Region X's at-large assembly district for the Interim Batasang Pambansa and was also included in Misamis Oriental's at-large congressional district in the earlier meetings of the Philippine national legislatures from 1931 to 1972. It was last represented by Constantino Jaraula of the Lakas–CMD.

Representation history

See also
Legislative districts of Cagayan de Oro

References

Former congressional districts of the Philippines
Politics of Cagayan de Oro
1984 establishments in the Philippines
1986 disestablishments in the Philippines
1987 establishments in the Philippines
2007 disestablishments in the Philippines
At-large congressional districts of the Philippines
Congressional districts of Northern Mindanao
Constituencies established in 1984
Constituencies disestablished in 2007